United Mizo Freedom Organisation (UMFO), was a political party in the Lushai Hills (today the Indian state of Mizoram). UMFO was founded on 20 July 1947, as a split from the Mizo Union. At the time of Indian independence, UMFO was the second largest political force in the area.

UMFO's demand was the unification of the Lushai Hills with Burma.

In the 1952 Assam Legislative Assembly election (which the Lushai Hills at that time was part of), UMFO put up three candidates, none of whom were elected. In total, the party received 9070 votes (23.76% of the votes in those three constituencies).

In 1955 UMFO merged with the Eastern Indian Tribal Union.

References

Defunct political parties in Mizoram
1946 establishments in India
Political parties established in 1946
Political parties disestablished in 1955